Shuwaikh is a seaside district of Kuwait City in Kuwait. It comprises eight blocks. Shuwaikh also has an industrial area, a port, a commercial area, a healthcare area and an education area; all of which form their own census-designated districts.

Area 
The area of Shuwaikh is partly industrial and partly rural. This area offers Souq al-Juma which is a Friday market that sells many things such as furniture, clothes, animals, new and used goods, and much more. Shuwaikh is commonly recognized for the Shuwaikh port which is Kuwait's most important port because it contains a power station and water desalination which supplies all of Kuwait city.

See also
Shuwaikh Port
Shuwaikh Industrial Area

References

Suburbs of Kuwait City